Holdman is an unincorporated community in Umatilla County, Oregon, United States. The town was named for the Holdman brothers, early settlers of the area. Holdman post office was established in 1900.

Holdman is part of the Pendleton–Hermiston Micropolitan Statistical Area.

References

Pendleton–Hermiston Micropolitan Statistical Area
Unincorporated communities in Umatilla County, Oregon
1900 establishments in Oregon
Populated places established in 1900
Unincorporated communities in Oregon